Tisiphone (minor planet designation: 466 Tisiphone) is an asteroid which orbits among the Cybele family of asteroids.

Discovery
It was discovered by Max Wolf and Luigi Carnera on January 17, 1901, and was assigned the provisional designation 1901 FX. It was named after Tisiphone of Greek mythology.

Physical properties
A number of positional observations of Tisiphone were carried out in 1907, 1913, and 1914.

In 1992 a simple check of 466 Tisiphone's position was made by the Association of Lunar and Planetary Observers (ALPO).  The asteroid was found to be in the expected position to within observational errors.  Further checks were carried out in 1996, and 2006 with the asteroid in its expected position both times.

In 1997 Tisiphone was studied by Worman and Christianson at the Feder Observatory located near Minnesota State University, Moorhead, with the goal of determining its rotational period.  A period of 8.824 ± 0.009 was arrived at, with the lightcurve data showing two distinct maxima and minima in its rotation.

In 2001 Lagerkvist et al. published their results on a study of the Cybele asteroid family, which includes 466 Tisiphone.  Relative photometric observations of Tisiphone were carried out in 1998 and 1999 using the 1.2 m telescope at the Calar Alto Observatory located at the Max-Planck-Institut für Astronomie in Heidelberg, Germany.  They were able to confirm the 8.8 hour rotation period obtained by Worman and Christianson.

In 2006 Fornasier et al. published polarimetric data for a number of asteroids, including 466 Tisiphone.

Further reading

References

External links
 
 

Cybele asteroids
Tisiphone
Tisiphone
Tisiphone
C-type asteroids (Tholen)
19010117